Turkey–Uruguay relations are the diplomatic relations between Turkey and Uruguay. Turkey has an embassy in Montevideo. Uruguay has an embassy in Ankara and a consulate-general in Istanbul.

Economic relations 

Trade volume between the two countries was US$341.4 million in 2019 (Turkish exports/imports: 42.8/298.6 million USD).

See also

 Foreign relations of Uruguay
 Foreign relations of Turkey

References

 
Turkey
Uruguay